Nationality words link to articles with information on the nation's poetry or literature (for instance, Irish or France).

Events

Works published

England
 Peter Beverley, The Historie of Ariodanto and Ieneura
 Thomas Churchyard:
 Churchyard's Round
 Churchyardes Farewell
 Churchyardes Lamentacion of Freyndshyp
 Thomas Drant, translation (from the Latin of Horace's Ars Poetica) A Medicinable Morall (see also Horace his Arte of Poetrie 1567)

Births
Death years link to the corresponding "[year] in poetry" article:
 October 6 (birth year uncertain) — Marie de Gournay, also known as Marie le Jars, demoiselle de Gournay (died 1645), French writer, author of feminist tracts and poet; a close associate of Michel de Montaigne; buried in the Saint-Eustache Church in Paris
 November 26 – Francesco Bracciolini (died 1645), Italian
 Also:
 Giambattista Basile (died 1632), Italian poet, courtier and collector of fairy tales
 Thomas Bastard (died 1618), English poet and clergyman
 John Hoskins (died 1638), English poet, classicist and judge
 Luisa Carvajal y Mendoza (died 1614), Spanish aristocrat, religious poet and author and Catholic missionary to England

Deaths
Birth years link to the corresponding "[year] in poetry" article:
 April 25 – Louise Labé (born ca. 1524), French
 September 5, 6 or 7 – Suleyman the Magnificent (born ca. 1495), Ottoman Empire sultan and poet
 September 7 – Martin Bošňák (born ca. 1500), Slovak
 September 27 – Marco Girolamo Vida (born 1485), Italian, Latin-language poet
 October 31 – Richard Edwardes (or Edwards, born 1525), English poet and playwright
 November 17 – Annibale Caro (born 1507), Italian

See also

 Poetry
 16th century in poetry
 16th century in literature
 Dutch Renaissance and Golden Age literature
 Elizabethan literature
 French Renaissance literature
 Renaissance literature
 Spanish Renaissance literature

Notes

16th-century poetry
Poetry